"Congratulate" is a song by South African rapper AKA. It was released as the third single from his second studio album, Levels (2014). It was sent to radio stations across South Africa in March 2014. The song debuted at number 1 on Metro FM, 5FM and YFM. Moreover, it peaked at number 2 on South Africa's official music chart. "Congratulate" was produced by Tazzy, a member of the funk band Muzart.

Composition and meaning
"Congratulate" samples Harrison Crump's "Ride".  An electric piano chord was played simultaneously with the sample. The song is made up of three verses and a hook. The bassline of the song fluctuates throughout. The song feature backing vocals from JR. In "Congratulate", AKA raps about his journey to success. In early 2014, AKA sat down with SABC and spoke about the single. He said the song is about one celebrating the positive milestones in their lives. He also said he recorded the song to relate with ordinary people. In May 2015, "Congratulate" was certified Gold by the Recording Industry of South Africa.

Cover art and music video
AKA shared the artwork for "Congratulate" prior to releasing it. He posted the cover art on Twitter and tagged it with the hash-tag "#AKACongratulate". On 1 May 2014, the music video for the song was released. It was uploaded onto YouTube at a total length of 4 minutes and 2 seconds.

Accolades
The music video for "Congratulate" won Most Gifted Hip-hop and was nominated for Most Gifted Southern, as well as Most Gifted Video of the Year at the 2014 Channel O Music Video Awards.

Charts

Weekly charts

References

External links

2013 songs
2014 singles
South African songs
AKA (rapper) songs